Cyclaspis elegans is a species of small marine crustacean (cumacean) in the genus Cyclaspis that lives in Lyttelton Harbour, New Zealand.

References

Further reading
 

Cumacea
Marine crustaceans of New Zealand
Crustaceans described in 1907